Dave Gardner (born 1 February 1964) is a retired British basketball player, most famous for his stints at Chester Jets and Manchester Giants of the British Basketball League. Gardner also played 59 games for England. In honour of Gardner's services to his 'hometown' club, the Chester Jets retired his number 11 jersey in 2002.

References

1964 births
Living people
English men's basketball players
Cheshire Jets players
Centers (basketball)